Pravara is Sanskrit for "excellent" or "best".  It may also refer to:

 Sanskrit term for the call to a Brahmin to assume priestly functions; see Upanayanam
 an invocation of Agni at the beginning of sacrifice
 Pravaras, an invocation of ancestors
 Pravara Rural Engineering College
 Pravara River, a river, a tributary of Godavari River in the Indian state of Maharashtra